James Walter May (15 April 1910 – 24 November 1979) was an Australian rules footballer who played with Footscray in the Victorian Football League (VFL).

He later served in the Royal Australian Air Force during the final years of World War II.

Notes

External links 

1910 births
1979 deaths
Australian rules footballers from Victoria (Australia)
Western Bulldogs players
Golden Square Football Club players
Royal Australian Air Force personnel of World War II
Military personnel from Victoria (Australia)